Carl Hugo Johansson (16 June 1887 – 23 February 1977) was a Swedish sport shooter who competed at the 1912, 1920 and 1924 Summer Olympics.

In 1912 he won the gold medal as member of the Swedish team in the team free rifle event and the bronze medal in the team military rifle competition.

In the 1912 Summer Olympics he also participated in the following events:

 300 metre free rifle, three positions – fourth place
 600 metre free rifle – 23rd place

Eight years later he won the gold medal in the 600 metre military rifle, prone event and two bronze medals in military rifle team competitions.

In the 1920 Summer Olympics he also participated in the following events:

 Team 300 metre military rifle, prone – fifth place
 300 metre military rifle, prone – sixth place
 Team 300 and 600 metre military rifle, prone – sixth place
 Team free rifle – sixth place
 300 metre free rifle, three positions – place unknown

In the 1924 Summer Olympics he participated in the following events:

 Team free rifle – seventh place
 600 metre free rifle – eighth place

References

External links

profile

1887 births
1977 deaths
Swedish male sport shooters
ISSF rifle shooters
Olympic shooters of Sweden
Shooters at the 1912 Summer Olympics
Shooters at the 1920 Summer Olympics
Shooters at the 1924 Summer Olympics
Olympic gold medalists for Sweden
Olympic bronze medalists for Sweden
Olympic medalists in shooting
Medalists at the 1912 Summer Olympics
Medalists at the 1920 Summer Olympics
Sport shooters from Stockholm
19th-century Swedish people
20th-century Swedish people